The 1940 United States Senate special election in Vermont took place on November 5, 1940. Republican George Aiken was elected to the United States Senate to serve the remainder of the deceased Ernest W. Gibson, Sr.'s term, defeating Democratic candidate Herbert B. Comings. Aiken replaced Gibson's son, Ernest W. Gibson, Jr., who was appointed to fill the seat until a special election could be held.

Republican primary

Results

Democratic primary

Results

General election

Candidates
George Aiken, Governor of Vermont
Herbert B. Comings, state senator

Results

See also 

 United States Senate elections, 1940 and 1941

References

Vermont 1940
Vermont, special
1940, special
Special elections to the 76th United States Congress
Senate
United States Senate 1940